Kelly Bowen (born 7 August 1989) is an Australian professional basketball player.

Career

College
From 2008 to 2012, Bowen played for the Gonzaga Bulldogs located in Spokane, Washington. Participating in the NCAA's Division I and primarily in the West Coast Conference. During her time there, she played alongside Courtney Vandersloot.

WNBL
After a successful college career in the United States, Bowen began her WNBL career in Queensland, with the Townsville Fire. After a one-year absence, she returned home to Victoria, with the rebranded, Melbourne Boomers. She then moved to the Adelaide Lightning, where she would be co-captain alongside Leilani Mitchell.

International
During 2016, Bowen represented Australia in the 3x3 World Championships, held in Guangzhou, China.
Bowen was ranked Australia's number 1, 3x3 player during 2016.

References

1989 births
Living people
Forwards (basketball)
Australian women's basketball players
Sportswomen from Victoria (Australia)
Townsville Fire players
Adelaide Lightning players
Melbourne Boomers players
Australian expatriate basketball people in the United States
People from Frankston, Victoria
Basketball players from Melbourne